The following lists events from the year 2017 in Zimbabwe.

Incumbents
 President: Robert Mugabe (until 21 November), Emmerson Mnangagwa (since 24 November)
 First Vice President: Emmerson Mnangagwa (until 6 November), Constantino Chiwenga (starting 28 December)
 Second Vice President: Phelekezela Mphoko (until 27 November), Kembo Mohadi (starting 28 December)

Events

March
3 March - 2016–17 Zimbabwe floods: Government officials say that floods since December 2016 have killed 246 people and over 2000 people remain homeless as a result.

June
10 June - President Mugabe sacks Johannes Tomana from the role of chief prosecutor after a tribunal found him guilty of sexual misconduct and incompetence.

November
3 November - American producer Martha O'Donovan is arrested for allegedly insulting the President.
6 November - Vice President Mnangagwa is fired by Mugabe as a move perceived to be an attempt to get his wife, Grace, to succeed him as President if he dies.
14 November - Military forces take up positions on the streets of the capital of Harare in what the ruling party, ZANU-PF, calls an act of treason.
15 November - President Mugabe is overthrown as military forces seize the capital and a news station reporting the coup. The military issues a statement to remain calm and support the country's development as several officials are arrested.
18 November - Thousands of Zimbabweans celebrate on the streets of Harare at the downfall of Mugabe.
19 November - Mugabe is fired from the presidency of ZANU-PF and is replaced with Mnangagwa. He refuses to resign amid a request giving him 24 hours to do so or face impeachment.
21 November - Mugabe resigns after impeachment proceedings are launched.
24 November - Emmerson Mnangagwa is sworn in as the third President of Zimbabwe with elections pending next year.
25 November - Former finance minister Ignatius Chombo, arrested during the coup, is charged by the courts with corruption, fraud and power abuse.

Deaths
8 February – Patrick Mumbure Mutume, Roman Catholic bishop (b. 1943).

16 June – Edzai Kasinauyo, footballer (b. 1975)

References

 
Years of the 21st century in Zimbabwe
Zimbabwe
Zimbabwe
2010s in Zimbabwe